Gerhard Ernst Friedrich Harig (31 July 1902, Niederwürschnitz – 13 October 1966, Leipzig) was a German  physicist, Marxist philosopher,  professor and statesman who served as the first State Secretary of Higher and Technical Education of the German Democratic Republic.

Biography 
Gerhard Harig was born in to the family of a physician. In the 1920s, he studied physics and mathematics, and later on received a doctorate of philosophy in Leipzig. He was an assistant employee at the RWTH Aachen University and was also a member of the Society of the Friends of New Russia.  

After the Nazi seizure of power, in March/April 1933, Harig was arrested and detained. Although he was active in the Communist Party of Germany (KPD), he was released in October 1933 and fled to the Soviet Union. He started to work as a researcher at Joffe Institute and later on the Soviet Academy of Sciences. In 1937 he was arrested by the NKVD on accusations of being a German spy; however, he was recruited as a Soviet spy and sent back to Germany. In 1938, he was arrested by the Reich and was held at the Buchenwald concentration camp.   

After the end of the Nazi regime, he became head of the statistical office, including the electoral and list office, in Leipzig in November 1945/46. From July 1946 he was the main advisor for philosophy in the Central Secretariat of the Socialist Unity Party in Berlin. In 1948, he received his professorship at the Faculty of Social Sciences of the Leipzig University and was appointed director of the Franz Mehring Institute at the university.    

In 1950 he was appointed head of the Main Department for Universities and Scientific Institutions in the Ministry of Popular Education. From March 1951 to 1957 Harig was appointed a member of the Council of Ministers and first State Secretary of the newly established State Secretariat for Higher Education. In 1958, he returned to Karl Marx University and became a professor at the faculty of history of social sciences.

References

1902 births
1966 deaths
German communists
20th-century German physicists
People from Erzgebirgskreis
German emigrants to the Soviet Union
Buchenwald concentration camp survivors
Emigrants from Nazi Germany
German Marxists
German philosophers
Socialist Unity Party of Germany politicians
Communist Party of Germany politicians
Leipzig University alumni
Recipients of the Patriotic Order of Merit in silver
Recipients of the Banner of Labor